Lake Garwood is a lake at the lower end of Garwood Valley on the Scott Coast of Victoria Land, Antarctica. The lake receives meltwater from Garwood Glacier at the valley head. It was named by Thomas Griffith Taylor of the British Antarctic Expedition, 1910–13, in association with Garwood Glacier.

References

Lakes of Victoria Land
Scott Coast